"Welcome to My Island" is a song by American singer-songwriter and record producer Caroline Polachek. It was released on December 5, 2022 through Perpetual Novice as the fourth single from Polachek's fourth album, Desire, I Want to Turn Into You (2023).

Background
Polachek wrote the song while recording her 2019 album, Pang. She said that the song was "a puzzle" that "went through a million versions to arrive at maximum brat mode". Additionally, she said; "While I was writing this song, I almost saw this from a point of view of egg trapping the sperm… It's maniacal, huge ego. This is the brattiest song I've ever made. I needed to go full brat rant mode. I don't think attitude wise I've ever really gotten to tear into this feeling of conflict and frustration. The record is dealing with catharsis and repression a lot. And I think setting up that tension on track one was part of the mission statement." Polachek also described it as a song for "the headless angels", a loose reference to her 2022 single "Billions".

Composition
"Welcome to My Island" has been described as an experimental pop, Calypso, electronic rock, electropop, and guitar pop song with a 1980s styled hook.

Music video
A music video was released on December 12, 2022. Directed by Polachek and her partner, artist Matt Copson, the visual shows her pushing away sperm, running across a construction site, vomiting coffee over a volcano background and more. The video features a cameo from American musician Weyes Blood as a barista.

Track listing

Notes
  signifies a co-producer

Release history

References

2022 singles
2022 songs
Caroline Polachek songs